Mirko Selvaggi (born 11 February 1985) is an Italian former professional road bicycle racer, who competed professionally between 2008 and 2016 for the , , , , , and  teams.

Biography
Born in Pistoia, Italy, Selvaggi turned professional with the UCI Professional Continental team  in 2008 after winning stage 2 in the Giro di Toscana. In 2009, he moved to  but the team was disbanded at the end of 2009. Selvaggi was then recruited by UCI ProTeam  recruited Selvaggi for his experience in spring classics.

Selvaggi joined  for the 2014 season, after his previous team –  – folded at the end of the 2013 season.

Major results

2006
 6th Ruota d'Oro
2007
 1st Trofeo Tempestini Ledo
 2nd Gran Premio di Poggiana
 3rd Overall Giro di Toscana
1st Stage 2
 7th Trofeo Franco Balestra
2012
 2nd Classic Loire Atlantique
 9th Tour du Finistère
2013
 4th Dwars door Vlaanderen
2014
 8th Coppa Bernocchi
2015
 6th Overall Tour of Turkey
2016
 10th Overall Four Days of Dunkirk

References

External links

1985 births
Living people
People from Pistoia
Italian male cyclists
Sportspeople from the Province of Pistoia
Cyclists from Tuscany